Queens Park is a park in Invercargill, New Zealand, and was part of the original plan when Invercargill was founded in 1856. It is just north of the city centre, bounded by Queens Drive to the east, Kelvin Street to the west, Gala Street to the south and Herbert Street to the north. The Gala Street entrance features the Feldwick Gates, built in 1924 and named after John Feldwick, brother of MP Henry Feldwick.

The park has an 18-hole golf course, a botanical garden, an aviary and sports grounds. It is also the home to the Southland Museum and Art Gallery and the Southland Astronomical Society Observatory. The cricket ground in the park is the home ground of the Southland cricket team, and is also regularly used by the Otago cricket team for first-class and one-day matches. However, in September 2021, the cricket ground was stripped of its first-class status due to drainage issues. The park also gives its name to one of Invercargill's association football clubs, Queens Park A.F.C.

On the northern edge of the park are Waihopai School (formerly Waihopai Primary School) and Southland Boys' High School. Despite being within the bounded areas of the park, neither are considered a part of it.

Notable events 
The park co-hosted (along with Southland Boys' High School) the 2006 State Twenty20 Cricket Knock-Out Tournament, on 10–12 November 2006.

The final round of the tournament was set to be played at Queens Park but due to bad weather only 4 of the scheduled 9 matches took place.

The weekly Saturday Invercargill parkrun takes place at Queens Park. Organized by volunteers, the 5km run welcomes all runners with all fitness levels. In July 2020, the Invercargill parkrun become one of the first in the world to resume after Covid-19 halted the weekly event in early 2020.

References

External links
 New Zealand Tourism Online's article on Queens Park
 Queens Park history at Invercargill City Council website

1856 establishments in New Zealand
Parks in Invercargill
Sports venues in Invercargill
Cricket grounds in New Zealand
Protected areas of Southland, New Zealand